The Miss Ohio World competition, also referred to as Miss World America Ohio, is a beauty pageant that selects the representative for Ohio in the Miss World America pageant.

The current Miss Ohio World is Tori Nelson of Mason.

Gallery of titleholders

Winners 
Color key

Notes to table

References

External links

Ohio culture
Women in Ohio